Jos East is a Local Government Area in Plateau State, Nigeria. Its headquarters are in the town of Angware. its predominant tribe is The Afizere' also known as Jarawa, Jos East is a dividend of Jos where Jos North, and Jos south are the rest dividends, Jos east is a local government in plateau state, the Asharwa international  dance group is major dance group of the Afizere people they represented Nigeria in countries like UK, US, South Africa, Kenya, Ukraine etc. It's also a very well known tribe in Nigeria.

It had an area of 1,020 km and a population of 85,602 at the 2006 census.

The postal code of the area is 930.

References

Local Government Areas in Plateau State